Bigg Boss 13, also known as Bigg Boss Tedha, was the thirteenth season of the Indian reality TV series Bigg Boss and premiered on 1 October 2019 on Colors TV. Salman Khan hosted the season for the tenth time. The finale was scheduled for January, but it was given a one-month extension, and became the second-longest season. The grand finale of the show took place on 15 February 2020, and Sidharth Shukla was announced as the winner whereas Asim Riaz became the runner-up. It became the most successful Bigg Boss season since the inception of the series and also the most watched.Bigg Boss 13 Had Average 2.1-2.5 Trp Every Week, It Was The Most Successful Season in History

Production
This season it was revealed by the show makers that this season will only feature celebrity contestants, therefore declaring no commoners.

Eye Logo
The season featured a red eye logo with several fire flares coming out of it. The pupil of the eye was sky blue with a black lens in it.

House
House pictures were officially released on 23 September 2019; the House followed the theme of a "Bigg Boss Museum" and was located in Goregaon. On Week 16, BB Jail was closed introducing BB Elite Club.

Housemates status

Housemates 
The participants in the order of appearance and entered in house are:

Original entrants
 Sidharth Shukla – Television and film actor. He was known for his role of Shiv in Balika Vadhu and Parth Bhanushali in Dil Se Dil Tak. He hosted India's Got Talent and Savdhaan India.  He was the winner of Fear Factor: Khatron Ke Khiladi 7 in 2016 and participated in Jhalak Dikhhla Jaa 6. He also acted in Humpty Sharma Ki Dulhania in 2014. 
 Siddhartha Dey – Writer. He has written for many reality shows like Bigg Boss, Jhalak Dikhhla Jaa and Indian Idol.
 Paras Chhabra – Television actor and model. He participated in MTV Splitsvilla 5 and became the winner in 2012. He later again participated in MTV Splitsvilla 8. He has also appeared in shows like Badho Bahu, Kaleerein and Karn Sangini.
 Abu Malik – Singer and brother of music director Anu Malik. He acted in the film Pyaar Kiya Toh Darna Kya.
Asim Riaz – Model.
Mahira Sharma – Television actress. She is known for her roles in Naagin 3, Kundali Bhagya and Bepanah Pyaar.
 Devoleena Bhattacharjee – Television actress. She is known for her role of Gopi Modi in Saath Nibhaana Saathiya. She participated in reality shows like Dance India Dance and Box Cricket League.
 Rashami Desai – Television actress. She is known for playing the roles of Tapasya in Uttaran and Shorvari in Dil Se Dil Tak. She also featured in films like Dabangg 2 and reality shows Jhalak Dikhhla Jaa, Fear Factor: Khatron Ke Khiladi and Nach Baliye.
 Shehnaaz Gill – Punjabi singer and actress. She has featured in the music video song "Yeh Baby" by Garry Sandhu. She has also acted in films Kala Shah Kala and Daaka.
 Shefali Bagga – Journalist and television news anchor with the India Today group.
 Dalljiet Kaur – Television actress. She is known for her role of Anjali in Iss Pyaar Ko Kya Naam Doon?. She has appeared in other shows like Swaragini – Jodein Rishton Ke Sur, Qayamat Ki Raat, Silsila Badalte Rishton Ka and Guddan Tumse Na Ho Payega.
 Koena Mitra –  Indian actress and model. She is known for appearing in the film Musafir for the item song 'Saki Saki'.
 Arti Singh – Television actress. She is known for her role of Amba in Waaris. She has also appeared in other shows like Sasural Simar Ka, Parichay – Nayee Zindagi Kay Sapno Ka, Uttaran, Udaan, Comedy Classes, Comedy Nights Bachao and Box Cricket League.

Wildcard entrants
 Vikas Pathak aka Hindustani Bhau – YouTuber
 Tehseen Poonawalla – Lawyer and political analyst
 Khesari Lal Yadav – Indian actor, singer, and model associated with Bhojpuri cinema.
 Shefali Jariwala – Indian actress, known for her music video "Kaanta Laga".
 Arhaan Khan – Indian model and actor.
 Himanshi Khurana – Indian Punjabi-language singer and actor. Her songs include " High Standard" and "I Like It".
 Vishal Aditya Singh – Television actor. He is known for his roles in Lakhan and Shakti  Thakur in Begusarai , Veer Pratap Singh in Chandrakanta and Tevar Singh in  Kullfi Kumarr Bajewala. He participated in Nach Baliye 9 along with his ex - Girlfriend Madhurima Tuli and emerged as the 2nd runner-up.
 Madhurima Tuli – Television actress. She is known for her roles as Chandrakanta Singh in  Chandrakanta, Tanushree in  Kumkum Bhagya and Qayamat Ki Raat.She participated in Nach Baliye 9 along with his ex-boyfriend Vishal Aditya Singh and emerged as the 2nd runner-up.

Proxy entrants
 Vikas Gupta – Producer. Vikas was known as the head of channels MTV India and &TV. He was also the head creative producer of the show Kis Desh Mein Hai Meraa Dil. He was a 2nd Runner Up of season 11 . He entered as a replacement of Devoleena.

Twists 

This season featured various twists, following are few of the twists:

Bed Friend Forever (BFF)
On Launch Day before housemates entering the house, female housemate were given two options to choose from to be their BFF. Bigg Boss later announced that they have to abide by the rules and can not change their bed partners.

Due to legal issues, this concept was canceled by Bigg Boss on Day 10.

BB Elite Club 

In week 16, Bigg Boss announced about BB Elite Club whose members will get some special privileges and power to save themselves from being nominated for any one week before the finale week.

Connection Week 

In Week 18 (Only for Week 18), Bigg Boss announced that connections of housemates will come to play with their connections.

Weekly summary
The main events in the house are summarised in the table below. A typical week began with nominations, followed by the shopping task, and then the eviction of a housemate during the Sunday episode. Evictions, tasks, and other events for a particular week are noted in order of sequence.

Guest appearances

Nominations table 

Color key
  indicates that the Housemate was directly nominated for eviction.
  indicates that the Housemate was immune prior to nominations.
  indicates the contestant has been evicted.
  indicates the contestant walked out.
  indicates that the Housemate has been evicted by Housemates.
  indicates the contestant has been ejected by bigg boss.
  indicates that the housemate has re entered.
  indicates the house captain.
  indicates the House Queen.

Nomination notes
 : Only male housemates were eligible to nominate.
 : The Voting Lines were closed for the week.
 : Bigg Boss gave a task as part of the nomination process.
 : On Day 20, Salman revealed that Abu and Siddharth D received the least votes. And the female housemates had the power to Vote to Eject one of them. Abu received the most votes and therefore, was ejected.
 : Sidharth S was nominated for 2 weeks due to violent behaviour
 : Shehnaaz was nominated by Bigg Boss for 1 week as she disobeyed Bigg Boss Orders
 : On Day 54, Bigg Boss asked all the contestants to tell one name from the nominated contestants i.e, Arti, Devoleena, Khesari, Sidharth S and Rashami who has given less contribution to the show, Majority took Khesari's name. Bigg Boss announced that This was a process to evict one contestant. Since Majority took Khesari's name, He was evicted.
 : On Day 62, Devoleena left the issue due to medical issues.
 : Shehnaaz was immuned from nominations as she was declared as the entertainer of the season.
 : On Day 67, Paras left the house for medical treatment due to injury on his finger and was removed from nomination list.
 : On Day 70, Salman revealed that Himanshi and Shefali J were in Bottom 2, Majority saved Shefali J and Himanshi was evicted.
 : On Day 70, Vikas Gupta entered the house as Devoleena's proxy
 : Sidharth S was punished for pushing Asim and was nominated for 2 weeks.
 : On Day 71, Bigg boss announced that Sidharth needs to go to the hospital immediately for treatment but he will be a part of the show.
 : On Day 71, Paras and Sidharth entered the Secret Room
 : On Day 72, After the nomination process was completed, Paras and Sidharth were given a privilege to save one nominated contestant, They saved Mahira
 : On Day 85, Since the eviction was cancelled, The nominations will be carryforwarded to the following week. Since Asim was the captain, He was immune from nominations.
 : On Day 87, Bigg Boss announced that Vikas Gupta's stay at house was completed as Devoleena's health condition is not good and she will not be returning to the show.
 : On Day 98, Salman announced that Madhurima and Shefali Bagga are in Bottom 2. Rest of the housemates had the power to eject one of them. Majority took Shefali Bagga's name and She was evicted.
 : On Day 99, Madhurima was punished for beating Vishal with a slipper and was nominated for 2 weeks by Bigg Boss
 : On Day 105, On the occasion of the season's huge success, Salman announced No eviction but the nominations will be carryforwarded to the following week.
 : On Day 112, Madhurima was ejected from the house due to physical violence
 : On Day 126, As Shehbaz and Vikas Gupta won the task, They had a power to save one housemate from nominations, They saved Arti.
 : On Day 129, As the nomination Task was cancelled, Asim, Sidharth and Rashami used their Elite Club Immunity and became the 1st 3 finalists
 : On Day 132, In Task, Sidharth saved Paras from nominations and became the 4th finalist

References

External links
 Official Website

2019 Indian television seasons
2020 Indian television seasons
13